The 1983 season in Swedish football, starting January 1983 and ending December 1983:

Honours

Official titles

Competitions

Promotions, relegations and qualifications

Promotions

League transfers

Relegations

International qualifications

Domestic results

Allsvenskan 1983

Allsvenskan play-off 1983 
Quarter-finals

Semi-finals

Final

Allsvenskan promotion play-off 1983

Division 2 Norra 1983

Division 2 Södra 1983

Division 2 promotion play-off 1983

Svenska Cupen 1982–83 
Final

National team results

Notes

References 
Print

Online

 
Seasons in Swedish football